Cai Cheng ( (November 1927 – September 2, 2009), was a politician of the People's Republic of China, born  in Puning, Jieyang, Guangdong.

Biography
He was the Minister of Justice from 1988 to 1993.

Cai Cheng was the 13th CPC Central Committee member from 1987 to 1992.

External links
 Profile of Cai Cheng
Cai Cheng profile

1927 births
2009 deaths
Politicians from Jieyang
People's Republic of China politicians from Guangdong
Chinese Communist Party politicians from Guangdong
Ministers of Justice of the People's Republic of China
Members of the 13th Central Committee of the Chinese Communist Party
Chinese police officers